Peter Mankoč (born 4 July 1978 in Ljubljana, Slovenia) is a Slovenian swimmer. He is one of the most successful short course European Championship swimmers in the history of the event. Mankoč is the former world record holder in the 100 meter individual medley (short course).

Personal 
Mankoč was born in Ljubljana, where he has lived most of his life. He began swimming competitively at the age of eight. During his swimming career, he was employed as a police officer by the Slovenian government.

He is married to an Estonian swimmer Triin Aljand. They have two daughters Brina and Elise and one son Erik.

Swimming 
With height of 1.92 m and weight of 87 kg, Mankoč has always been a short distance swimmer. His strength and explosiveness led to short courses sprint preference, where he has achieved his best results.

Mankoč is a member of Ilirija Ljubljana swimming club, where he developed under coach Dimitrij Mancevič.

Swimming career overview 
Mankoč participated in five Olympic Games, 1996, 2000, 2004, 2008 and 2012. His best result is a 10th place in the 100 metre butterfly at the 2008 Olympic Games.

He also participated in four long course World Championships, from 2001 to 2007.

He was swimming in 1997, 1999, 2000, 2002 and 2004 European Championship competitions with 4 finals appearances.

Apart from 5 short course World Championships medals, he also has 7 other finals finishes from 1997 to 2006.

Mankoč participated in 11 European Championship short course events, where he collected 17 medals in 26 finals appearances. He is the only swimmer with nine consecutive gold medals in one discipline, the 100 meter individual medley. In this event, he won 14 consecutive medals, from 1999 to 2012.

Personal best times 

Mankoč’s best times are sorted by FINA points calculation, a scoring system of the world swimming federation, which allows comparisons amongst different events. The points are correct in 2004–2008 Olympic game cycle. The ranking is correct  and represents European all-time ranking of personal records.

25 m course

50 m course

References 
 Slovenian Swimming Federation
 Official Web site

External links 

 

1978 births
Living people
Olympic swimmers of Slovenia
Slovenian male swimmers
Male medley swimmers
Slovenian male freestyle swimmers
Male butterfly swimmers
Swimmers at the 1996 Summer Olympics
Swimmers at the 2000 Summer Olympics
Swimmers at the 2004 Summer Olympics
Swimmers at the 2008 Summer Olympics
Swimmers at the 2012 Summer Olympics
Sportspeople from Ljubljana
World record setters in swimming
Medalists at the FINA World Swimming Championships (25 m)
European Aquatics Championships medalists in swimming
Mediterranean Games gold medalists for Slovenia
Mediterranean Games bronze medalists for Slovenia
Swimmers at the 2001 Mediterranean Games
Swimmers at the 2005 Mediterranean Games
Swimmers at the 2009 Mediterranean Games
Universiade medalists in swimming
Mediterranean Games medalists in swimming
Universiade silver medalists for Slovenia
Universiade bronze medalists for Slovenia
Medalists at the 2001 Summer Universiade
Medalists at the 2003 Summer Universiade
20th-century Slovenian people
21st-century Slovenian people